The 2019 Women's Junior AHF Cup, also known as the AirAsia Women's Junior AHF Cup 2019 due to sponsorship reasons, was the fifth edition of the Women's Junior AHF Cup.

It was held at the Sengkang Hockey Stadium in Singapore from 9 to 15 September 2019. The top two teams qualified for the 2021 Junior Asia Cup.

The hosts Singapore won the tournament for the first time by finishing first in the round-robin tournament.

Results
Al times are local (UTC+8).

Pool

Fixtures

See also
2019 Men's Junior AHF Cup

References

Junior AHF Cup
Junior AHF Cup
International women's field hockey competitions hosted by Singapore
Junior AHF Cup
AHF Cup
Women's Junior AHF Cup